Chhnal Moan is a khum (commune) of Koas Krala District in Battambang Province in north-western Cambodia.

Chhnal

 Chhnal Moan
 Krang Svat
 Banteay Char
 Ruessei Preah
 Prey Sen
 Prey Totueng
 Samraong

References

Communes of Battambang province
Koas Krala District